Rixey may refer to:

People
 Eppa Rixey (1891–1963), Major League Baseball pitcher
 George F. Rixey (1888–1974), first Deputy Chief of Chaplains of the United States Army
 John Franklin Rixey (1854–1907), American politician
 Presley Marion Rixey (1852–1928), US Navy Rear Admiral,  Surgeon General of the United States Navy, and presidential physician

Other uses
 USS Rixey (APH-3), a casualty evacuation transport ship in the US Navy
 Rixey, Virginia, United States